Amos Dean (January 16, 1803 – January 26, 1868) was an American academic administrator and attorney who served as the first president of the University of Iowa, serving from 1855 to 1859.

Dean was born in Barnard, Vermont. He attended Union College and later practiced law in Upstate New York.

References

External links
 The Amos Dean Papers are housed at the University of Iowa Special Collections & University Archives.

Presidents of the University of Iowa
1803 births
1868 deaths
People from Barnard, Vermont
Union College (New York) alumni
19th-century American educators